Redmi K50 is a line of Android-based smartphones manufactured by Xiaomi and marketed under its Redmi sub-brand. Redmi K50 Gaming was launched globally as Poco F4 GT.

Gallery

References 

Mobile phones introduced in 2022
Android (operating system) devices
Phablets
Mobile phones with multiple rear cameras
Mobile phones with 4K video recording
K50